Indole-3-carbaldehyde (I3A), also known as indole-3-aldehyde and 3-formylindole, is a metabolite of dietary  which is synthesized by human gastrointestinal bacteria, particularly species of the Lactobacillus genus. I3A is a biologically active metabolite which acts as a receptor agonist at the aryl hydrocarbon receptor in intestinal immune cells, in turn stimulating the production of interleukin-22 which facilitates mucosal reactivity.

Biosynthesis in humans and cellular effects

Chemistry
Indole-3-carbaldehyde has reactivity typical of aromatic aldehydes. It can is easily oxidized to indole-3-carboxylic acid. It condenses with nitromethane in a Henry reaction to give 3-nitrovinyl indole.

Antifungal properties
Indole-3-carbaldehyde has antifungal properties, and partially accounts for the protection from chytridiomycosis seen in amphibian species which carry Janthinobacterium lividum on their skin.

References

Amino acid derivatives
Indoles
Aromatic aldehydes